Jiří Němec (born 15 May 1966 in Pacov) is a Czech former professional footballer who played as a midfielder. He played for Czechoslovakia and later the Czech Republic.

He won a total of 84 international caps for the two teams, scoring one goal, and played at both Euro 96 and Euro 2000.

At club level, he spent nine seasons with Schalke 04 in Germany, playing 256 Bundesliga games and scoring six goals. He was an integral part of their defence when they won the UEFA Cup in May 1997.

Honours
Sparta Prague
 Czechoslovak First League: 1990–91, 1992–93
 Czechoslovak Cup: 1989–90, 1991–92
 Czech First League: 2002–03

Schalke 04
 DFB-Pokal: 2000–01, 2001–02
 UEFA Cup: 1996–97

Czech Republic
 UEFA European Football Championship: Runner-up Medal 1996

Individual
 Czech Footballer of the Year: 1997
 Golden Ball (Czech Republic): 1997

References

External links
 
 International Appearances at RSSSF

1966 births
Living people
People from Pacov
Czech footballers
Czechoslovak footballers
Association football midfielders
1990 FIFA World Cup players
UEFA Euro 1996 players
1997 FIFA Confederations Cup players
UEFA Euro 2000 players
Dukla Prague footballers
AC Sparta Prague players
FK Chmel Blšany players
SK Dynamo České Budějovice players
FK Viktoria Žižkov players
FC Schalke 04 players
Czech Republic international footballers
Czechoslovakia international footballers
Dual internationalists (football)
Bundesliga players
Czech First League players
Czech expatriate footballers
Expatriate footballers in Germany
Czech expatriate sportspeople in Germany
UEFA Cup winning players
Sportspeople from the Vysočina Region